Tsem Tulku Rinpoche (24 October 1965 – 4 September 2019) was a recognised tulku of Kalmyk descent, an incarnate lama of the Gelug school of Tibetan Buddhism, and the founder and spiritual guide of Kechara House Buddhist Association with its headquarters in Malaysia.

Rinpoche was born on 24 October 1965 in Taiwan to a Tibetan father and Mongolian mother, and was adopted by an American-Mongolian family. His adoptive name was Burcha Bugayeff. In 1987, at the age of 22, Rinpoche received full ordination from the 14th Dalai Lama and became a monk of Ganden Shartse Monastery in India. Starting in 1992 Rinpoche has lived in Malaysia where he commenced work on the establishment of Dharma Institutes. One of the institutes he founded is known as Kechara House Buddhist Association. He also founded a charity organization known as Kechara Soup Kitchen and the dharma retreat centre Kechara Forest Retreat.

In the meantime, Rinpoche took a stand against the position of the Central Tibetan Administration in the Dorje Shugden controversy and built the world's largest Dorje Shugden statue. Rinpoche strongly supported the Dorje Shugden religious practice, prohibited in 1996 by the Central Tibetan Administration, and was a critical voice advocating for the separation of politics and religion which is a feature of Tibetan Buddhism. He was known for his advice against the self-immolation protests by Tibetans in China. For his dissenting opinions, he was marked as a controversial Buddhist teacher  although Rinpoche simultaneously advocated devotion for both the 14th Dalai Lama and the Dorje Shugden religious practice.

Rinpoche died on September 4, 2019 after a long illness.

Major works 
 Gurus for Hire: Enlightenment for Sale, Kechara Publications, 2005  
 Faces of Enlightenment, Kechara Publications, 2006   	
 Why I Make Myself Unhappy, Kechara Publications, 2005  	
 Compassion Conquers All: Teachings on the Eight Verses of Mind Transformation, Kechara Publications, 2007 ,   
 Nothing Changes Everything Changes, Kechara Publications, 2007 , (Online)
 If Not Now, When?, Kechara Publications, 2008 
 Snakes, Roosters & Pigs, Kechara Publications, 2011 
 The Living Buddha Within, Kechara Publications, 2012 
 The Promise (4th Edition), Kechara Publications, 2017

References

External links 

Tsem Tulku - Chinese Buddhist Encyclopedia entry.

1965 births
2019 deaths
Dorje Shugden lamas
Buddhism in Malaysia
American people of Mongolian descent
American people of Tibetan descent
Tibetan Buddhism writers